Antonio Ciliberti (31 January 1935 – 1 April 2017) was a Roman Catholic archbishop.

Ordained to the priesthood in 1959, Ciliberti served as bishop of the Diocese of Locri-Gerace, Italy from 1988 to 1993. He then served as archbishop of the Archdiocese of Matera-Irsina from 1993 to 2003 and metropolitan archbishop of Catanzaro-Squillace from 2003 to 2011.

Notes

External links

1935 births
2017 deaths
Italian Roman Catholic archbishops